

Incumbents
 President – Kolinda Grabar-Kitarović 
 Prime Minister – Andrej Plenković
 Speaker – Gordan Jandroković

Events
 21 May – Mate Pavić reaches the number 1 spot in the ATP doubles ranking list for the first time.
 15 July – Croatia national football team wins second place in the 2018 FIFA World Cup in Russia after losing 4–2 to France in the final.
 25 November - Croatia won last old-format Davis Cup.
 4 December– Luka Modrić  wins the Ballon d'Or

Deaths
 2 January – Željko Senečić, production designer, film director and screenwriter
 8 March – Milko Kelemen, composer
 14 March – Petar Stipetić, general
 15 July – Dragutin Šurbek, table tennis player
 16 July – Marija Kohn, actress
 29 July – Oliver Dragojević, singer
 8 December – Milan Sijerković, meteorologist
 24 December – Stanko Poklepović, football manager
 27 December – Jakša Fiamengo, poet

References

 
2010s in Croatia
Years of the 21st century in Croatia
Croatia
Croatia